Druga godba is a world music festival organized yearly in Ljubljana, Slovenia.

Druga godba is one of the most important music festivals in Central Europe. Its concept, variety of new approaches and enthusiasm for less well-known music from across the globe is unique to this part of the world.

History 
Druga godba Festival was established in 1984 in Ljubljana. Its programme was primarily concerned with different kinds of varieties in music: alternative rock, rock in opposition, adventurous new jazz, improvised music and experimental music, as well as rediscovered Slovenian folk music. Druga godba was the first festival in the former Yugoslavia to introduce popular musics and styles from the Third World, including reggae and various styles of African music. In 1990 the Druga Godba organisation became a member of the European Forum of Worldwide Music Festivals (EFWMF). This is a network of 43 festivals and 13 associate council members from 20 European countries, and incorporates a wide range of European world music festivals of the very highest quality. Druga godba won a Župančič Award in 2006 for an original festival concept. In May 2008 Druga godba worked with the Slovenian Tourist Board on a campaign to promote Slovenia in the United States. Two special musical events were organised in New York City in collaboration with National Geographic Traveler – the first in Joe’s Pub, the legendary jazz venue, which played host to the group Godalika and guests, as well as Fake Orchestra, and the second at the Town Hall, with a concert which featured Laibach, Bratko Bibič and Guy Klucevsek, Vasko Atanasovski, Marc Ribot and Greg Cohen, Brina, Zlatko Kaučič, Silence and Katalena. Every year since 2011, Druga godba has been selected as one of the 25 best international festivals in the world by the British world music magazine Songlines. In 2015 Druga godba Festival will be organized from 28–30 May on various locations in Ljubljana -- Cankar Hall, Kino Šiška, Metelkova and Stara Mestna Elektrarna.

Performances 
Musicians which performed on Druga godba :

 Afro-Cuban All Stars
 Akua Naru
 Andy Palacio
 Aziza Brahim
 Batida
 Blitz the Ambassador 
 Bombino
 Bossa de Novo
 Božo Vrećo
 Bratko Bibič
 Brina
 Buckwheat Zydeco
 Canzoniere Grecanico Salentino
 Cesaria Evora
 Catch-Pop String-Strong
 Cheb Mami
 Chicago Underground Duo
 Damir Imamović
 Dennis Bovell
 D'Gary
 Djivan Gasparyan
 Elliott Sharp
 Ensemble Al-Kindi
 Fake Orchestra
 Foltin
 Fundamental
 Garmarna
 Getatchew Mekurya
 Godalika
 Gotan Project
 Greg Cohen
 Guy Klucevsek
 Hamza Shakur
 Hasna El Becharia
 Hayvanlar Alemi
 Hindi Zahra
 Huun-Huur-Tu
 Juana Molina
 Kaja Draksler
 Katalena
 Khaled
 Kimmo Pohjonen
 Krar Collective
 Laibach
 Las Migas
 Les Négresses Vertes

 Los de Abajo
 Madame Baheux
 Magnifico
 Marc Ribot
 Mariza
 Melt Yourself Down
 Mulatu Astatke
 Natacha Atlas
 Ned Rothenberg
 Noura Mint Seymali
 Nuru Kane
 Orchestra Baobab
 Orkestar Fejata Sejdića
 Oumou Sangare
 Peter Kowald
 Pixies
 Pixvae
 Rachid Taha
 Remmy Ongala
 Rubato
 Salif Keita
 Sam Mangwana
 Serbian Army Orchestra
 Sevdah Takht 
 Shutka Roma Rap
 Silence
 Silvia Perez Cruz
 Sons of Kemet
 Spaceways Inc
 Terrafolk
 The Comet Is Coming
 The Ex
 The Gun Club
 The Lounge Lizards
 The Roots
 Tinariwen
 Toti Soler
 Trevor Watts Moire Music
 Tune-Yards
 Vasko Atanasovski
 Vinko Globokar
 Wang Li
 Yasmine Hamdan
 Youssou N'Dour
 Zlatko Kaučič

References

External links 

 

Cultural events in Ljubljana
Recurring events established in 1984
Music festivals in Slovenia
World music festivals
1984 establishments in Yugoslavia
Music festivals established in 1984
Spring (season) events in Slovenia